This article presents a list of the historical events and publications of Australian literature during 1869.

Books 

 B. L. Farjeon — Snowed Up
 Maud Jeanne Franc — Silken Cords and Iron Fetters
 George A. Walstab — Double Harness

Short stories 

 Ada Cambridge — "The Vicar's Guest"
 Marcus Clarke — "Pretty Dick"

Children's and young adult fiction 

 Henry Kingsley — The Boy in Grey

Poetry 

 Emma Frances Anderson — "No Room for the Dead"
 Henry Kendall
 "Aboriginal Death-Song"
 "Galatea"
 Leaves from Australian Forests

Births 

A list, ordered by date of birth (and, if the date is either unspecified or repeated, ordered alphabetically by surname) of births in 1869 of Australian literary figures, authors of written works or literature-related individuals follows, including year of death.

 12 May — Frank Morton, poet (died 1923)
 3 August — Marie Pitt, poet and journalist (died 1948)
 6 August — David McKee Wright, poet (died 1928)
 7 August — E. J. Brady, poet (died 1952)
 21 August — Will H. Ogilvie, poet (died 1963)
 24 September — Edward Sorenson, poet (died 1939)
 3 October — Ada Augusta Holman, journalist and novelist (died 1949)

See also 
 1869 in Australia
 1869 in literature
 1869 in poetry
 List of years in Australian literature
List of years in literature

References

 
Australia
19th-century Australian literature
Australian literature by year